The 109th Battalion CEF was a unit of the Canadian Expeditionary Force, the men of which saw active service during the First World War.

History 
The battalion was formed from volunteers from the Ontario counties of Victoria and Haliburton. It was commanded by Lieutenant Colonel J.J Fee and headquartered in the town of Lindsay prior to embarkation.

By the spring of 1916 the battalion had reached a strength of 1050 men and was embarked for England. On arrival in London the battalion strength was reallocated as reinforcements to replace the dead in the 20th, 21st, 28th and 124th Battalions.

Perpetuation 
The battalion was perpetuated by the 1st Battalion, The Victoria and Haliburton Regiment but that unit was later disbanded.

See also 

 List of infantry battalions in the Canadian Expeditionary Force
 The Canadian Crown and the Canadian Forces
 Military history of Canada
 History of the Canadian Army
 Canadian Forces

References

External links 

 109th Battalion website

Military units and formations established in 1915
1915 establishments in Ontario
Military units and formations of Ontario
Battalions of the Canadian Expeditionary Force